The seventh season of Monk was originally broadcast in the United States on USA Network from July 18, 2008, to February 20, 2009. It consisted of 16 episodes. Tony Shalhoub, Traylor Howard, Ted Levine and Jason Gray-Stanford reprised their roles as the main characters. A DVD of the season was released on July 21, 2009.

Crew
Andy Breckman continued his tenure as show runner. Executive producers for the season included Breckman, David Hoberman, series star Tony Shalhoub, writer Tom Scharpling and Rob Thompson. Universal Media Studios was the primary production company backing the show. Randy Newman's theme ("It's a Jungle Out There") continued to be used, while Jeff Beal's original instrumental theme could be heard in some episodes. Directors for the season included Randall Zisk, David Hoberman, Michael W. Watkins, David Breckman and Andrei Belgrader. Writers for the season included Andy Breckman, Hy Conrad, Daniel Dratch, Tom Gammill, Dylan Morgan, Max Pross, Salvatore Savo, Josh Siegal, Joe Toplyn, Tom Scharpling and Peter Wolk.

Cast

All four main characters returned for the seventh season: Tony Shalhoub as former homicide detective Adrian Monk, Traylor Howard as Monk's faithful assistant Natalie Teeger, Ted Levine as SFPD captain Leland Stottlemeyer, and Jason Gray-Stanford as Lieutenant Randy Disher.

Héctor Elizondo joined the show as Dr. Neven Bell, Monk's new psychiatrist. Elizondo was cast after the death of the actor Stanley Kamel. Emmy Clarke returned as Julie Teeger, Natalie's daughter, and Tim Bagley reprised his role as Harold Krenshaw, Monk's number-one rival. Melora Hardin continued to portray Trudy Monk, Monk's deceased wife. Casper Van Dien made his first appearance as Lt. Steven Albright, a new love interest for Natalie who was a comrade of Natalie's late husband, Mitch, in the Navy. Jarrad Paul made his final appearance as Monk's upstairs neighbor, Kevin Dorfman. The season saw the return of various villains and acquaintances from the past in the 100th episode.

Episodes

Awards and nominations

Emmy Awards
 Outstanding Actor – Comedy Series (Tony Shalhoub, nominated)
 Outstanding Guest Actress – Comedy Series (Gena Rowlands for playing "Marge Johnson" in "Mr. Monk and the Lady Next Door", nominated)

Golden Globe Awards
 Best Actor – Musical or Comedy Series (Tony Shalhoub, nominated)

Screen Actors Guild
 Outstanding Actor – Comedy Series (Tony Shalhoub, nominated)

References

Monk (TV series)
2008 American television seasons
2009 American television seasons
Monk (TV series) seasons